Al-Ayoubi, (also El-Ayoubi, Al-Ayyubi, Arabic: آل الأَيّوبيّ), is the name of a prominent Levantine family of royal and noble lineage, dating back to the 11th century. Having originated in the ancient Armenian city Dvin,

In Dvin, the family were considered to be the political-military elite of the town, later they relocated to the Levant.

Origins 

Named after Najm ad-Din Ayyub the son of Shadhi Ibn Marwan a military elite fortress commander from Dvin, Armenia who became the governor of Tikrit, Najm ad-Din Ayyub then succeeded his father as the governor of Tikrit and shortly after he left Tikrit to become the governor of Baalbek under Imad al-Din Zengi. Then he surrendered Baalbek and went to Damascus and settled, where his son Saladin grew up and founded the Ayyubid dynasty.

The dynasty lasted 79 years, and it is considered one of the most influential dynasties in the history of the region.

It ruled modern day Egypt, Syria, Upper Mesopotamia, the Hejaz, Yemen and the North African coast up to the borders of modern-day Tunisia. Saladin became the King and was nicknamed Al-Malik Al-Naser (The Victorious King). He named members of the family as Emirs (Princes) over the various parts of his kingdom.

Modern history 
In the modern era the family played a key role in politics, economy, and many other domains. As its members served in key roles in modern-day Syria, Lebanon, Saudi Arabia, Jordan, and Iraq.

Today, the vast majority of the family lives in Damascus, Beirut, and Aleppo

In Syria 

 Ata Bey al-Ayyubi (1877-1951). 7th President of Syria. Born in Damascus, he studied public administration in Istanbul and had an influential political carrier, especially in the time of the French mandate.

 Hamo Agha Al-Ayoubi, Landlord, dignitaries, and a donor who owned large areas of agricultural land specifically in the District of Wadi Barada.
 Raouf Al Ayoubi (1883-1947). A notable freemason, he was born in Damascus, Syria. And was a senior official in the Ottoman Empire.
 Major General Shukri Pasha Al-Ayyubi (1851-1922). Born in Damascus, Syria. He was appointed governor of Damascus, Beirut And Aleppo and fought in WWI.
 Muhammad Hasan Al-Ayoubi, a combatant in the Great Syrian Revolt.
 Muhammad Ali Al-Ayoubi, a damascene socialite and merchant. It was noted that in his residence many important political meetings were held and weekly discussion including many government personalities took place.
 Mahmoud Al-Ayyubi (1932–2013), 57th Prime Minister of Syria and former Vice President of Syria, served under Hafez al-Assad.
 Dr. Sharif bin Khaled Al-Ayoubi (1910-1983). Notable Islamic scholar.

In Jordan 

 Saad Mohammed Juma Al-Ayoubi (1916–1979), the son of an Ottoman official and a merchant from Damascus, Syria. Saad got a degree in law from Damascus University in 1947 and started his career as the general director of publications and publishing in Amman 1948.

1965 he was appointed Minister of the Royal Hashemite Court by king Hussein of Jordan. In 1967 Saad became the Prime Minister of Jordan and the Minister of Defence. He spent his life in public service and wrote four books discussing and analysing

politics, history, and economics. He died on 19 August 1979 in London, United Kingdom.

 Muhammad Attallah Effendi Al-Ayyubi, governor of a provincial district [Kaymakam] of Al-Salt 1909.

In Saudi Arabia 

 Dr. Muhammad Zuhair bin Abd-Alwahab bin Muhammad bin Saleh Agha Al-Ayoubi, born in 1939. He was religiously schooled by Grand mufti Ahmad kuftaro in parallel with his traditional and academic education, he then became a member of the national union of the new born United Arab Republic. On 1964 he left Syria to Saudi Arabia where he was a co-founder of the Riyadh Radio and TV Stations and served as its director.

For his services King Faisal of Saudi Arabia granted him and his family Saudi citizenship. He went on and founded many schools and public organisations and supervised them till he died in 2013.

In Iraq 

 Ali Jawdat Al-Ayyubi (1853, 1969), 15th Prime Minister of Iraq. He served as Prime Minister for three terms (1934, 1949, 1957) under King Ghazi I, King Faisal II, and regent 'Abd al-Ilah

List of monarchs 

 Saladin, 1169–1193.
 Aziz Uthman. Son of Saladin, 1193–1198.
 Al-Mansur Nasir al-Din Muhammad. Son of al-Aziz Uthman, 1198–1200.
 Al-Adil Sayf al-Din Abu Bakr I. (Al-Adil I), brother of Saladin, 1200–1218.
 Al-Kamil. Son of al-Adil I, 1218–1238.

 Al-Adil Sayf al-Din Abu Bakr II. Son of al-Kamil, 1238–1240.
 As-Salih Ayyub. Son of al-Kamil, 1240–1249.
 Al-Mu'azzam Turan-Shah. Son of as-Salih Ayyub, 1249–1250.
 Al-Ashraf Musa. (nominal rule, under Mamluk sultan Aybak), 1250–1254.

Source:

Noteworthy 

 khatun Sitt al-Sham. Sister of Saladin, who founded many schools and hospitals Damascus besides her major interest in literature and culture and honoring writers, ibn khallikan described her deeds and said "She gave us lessons in mercy", she died in 1220 and was buried in Al-Sahiba Madrasa in Damascus.
 Ismael Abulfeda Al-Ayoubi (1273 - 1331). Born in Damascus, Syria. A geographer, historian and later became a governor of Hama. The crater Abulfeda on the Moon, is named after him.

Historical monuments 

 Citadel of Damascus in Damascus.
 Mausoleum of Saladin in Damascus.
 Citadel of Saladin near Lattia.
 Citadel of Saladin in Cairo.
 Statue of Saladin near the Citadel of Damascus.
 Mausoleum of Imam al-Shafi'i in Cairo.
 Ajloun Castle in Ajloun, Jordan.
 Minbar of Saladin currently in the Islamic Museum of Jerusalem.
 Al-Shamiyah al-Kubra Madrasa in Damascus.
 Al-Sahiba Madrasa in Damascus.
 A crown which was presented by His Imperial Majesty, Emperor of Germany, Wilhelm II on 1898 at the Mausoleum of Saladin in Damascus, later stolen by Lawrence of Arabia.

References 

Arab families
Syrian families
Political families of Syria
Lebanese noble families
Middle Eastern royal families
Middle Eastern royalty
Jordanian families